Julius Theodoor Hugo Uiterloo (December 13, 1934 – November 15, 1975), better known by his stage-name Lieve Hugo and his nickname Iko, was a Surinamese singer. He was one of the pioneers of the kaseko-genre; hence his other nickname King of Kaseko.

Biography

Washboard Orchestra
Lieve Hugo sang in a choir and played drums and percussion in a variety of bands with or without other retired boxers. In 1967 he joined Washboard Orchestra; in this band, who more or less invented kaseko, he was both a drummer and a singer. A mutated version headlined the 1970 Holland Festival at the Amsterdam Concertgebouw and got the crowd on their dancing feet. Health-reasons forced him to leave Washboard Orchestra and subsequently put down the drumsticks too.

Solo albums
Now living in the Bijlmermeer-area of Amsterdam, Lieve Hugo signed to EMI and released his debut solo-album in 1974. Lieve Hugo: King of Kaseko became one of the biggest-selling albums in Surinamese music. Lieve Hugo and his backing-band The Happy Boys toured extensively through the Netherlands, Belgium and South America. 1975 was the year that Suriname gained independence; Lieve Hugo chronicled the subject on his second album Wan Pipel (as in one people, one nation), but didn't live to see the moment.

During a performance at Club Sosa in Amsterdam, Lieve Hugo suffered a heart-attack; he died on November 15, 1975, ten days before the Independence Day-ceremony for which he was scheduled to play. His body was flown back to Suriname and buried at Mariusrust on November 23.

Happy Boys
The Happy Boys continued as a band with several lead vocalists, including Lieve Hugo's cousin Edgar Burgos. They released two albums in 1977 and 1978; debut album Akoeba included the tribute-song  Memoria Foe Iko (on the melody of Historia de amor). After the break-up in 1980, Burgos and four other Happy Boys formed the original line-up of Trafassi; they took Lieve Hugo's unfulfilled ambitions to further heights and became one of the leading live-acts in the Netherlands.

Revival and tribute-concert
In 2008, the Netherlands appeared to be ready for a Lieve Hugo-revival. The Metropole Orchestra paid tribute to the King of Kaseko at the Concertgebouw backing up artists such as De Dijk, Oscar Harris, Re-Play, Boris Titulaer, Berget Lewis, Izaline Calister, Angela Groothuizen and Edgar Burgos.

In 2013 both solo-albums were reissued on one cd as part of TopNotch's Sranan Gowtu-series (Surinamese Gold) devoted to Surinamese artists, mainly from the 1970s.

References 

1934 births
1975 deaths
20th-century Surinamese male singers
People from Paramaribo
Dutch-language singers